Roma S.C. was an American soccer club based in Paterson, New Jersey that was a member of the American Soccer League.

Year-by-year

Defunct soccer clubs in New Jersey
American Soccer League (1933–1983) teams
Sports in Paterson, New Jersey